Lasha Tabidze (born 4 July 1997)  is a Georgian rugby union player. He plays as Tighthead Prop for Bordeaux espoirs in Top 14. He was announced as best tighthead prop in 2016 World Rugby Under 20 Championship dream team.

References

1997 births
Living people
Rugby union players from Georgia (country)
Georgia international rugby union players
Rugby union props